The Dow University of Health Sciences (DUHS) is a public medical university located in the Urban metropolitan area of Karachi, Sindh, Pakistan. It was founded by Sir Hugh Dow, the then Governor of Sindh, in 1945.

The university comprises two health sciences undergraduate research institutes: Dow Medical College and Dow International Medical College. The university also has a very strong department of Postgraduate studies which monitors various basic medical sciences and clinical sciences programs at DUHS.

Established in 1945 as the Dow Medical College, it is known for its strong emphasis on economics biomedical, health, and medical research programmes. It is ranked among the top medical schools by HEC in 2010, 2011, 2012, 2013 and 2014.

Academics

The institution offers undergraduate, post-graduate, doctorate diplomas and certificate courses in almost all academic disciplines relating to medical sciences.

Undergraduate programs 
Dow Institute of Medical Technology offers Bachelor's programs 16 undergraduate degrees in four disciplines: Clinical Pathology Technology, Surgical Technology, Respiratory and Critical Care Technology and Ophthalmology.

 Bachelor of Medicine and Bachelor of Surgery
 Bachelors In Dental Surgery
 Doctor of Pharmacy
 BS Generic Nursing, Post RN Nursing
 Doctor of Physiotherapy
 BS Occupation Theory
 BS Prosthetics & Orthotics
 BS In Dental Care Professional (dental hygiene, dental technology)
 BS Medical Technology
 Specialties of DIMT
 Bachelors of Business Administration
 BS Nutrition Sciences
 BS Biotechnology

Post graduate programs 

 Master of Surgery
 M.Phil. Pharmacology
 M.Phil. Pharmaceutics
 M.Phil. Pharmaceutical Chemistry
 M.Phil. Pharmacognosy
 M.Phil. Pharmacy Practice
 Masters of Dental Surgery, Clinical
 Masters of Dental Surgery, Basic
 Masters of Dental Sciences, Clinical
 Masters of Dental Sciences, Basic
 Masters In Public Health
 Masters of Science In Public Health
 Masters of Health Professions’ Education
 Masters of science In Nursing
 MS Advanced Physiotherapy
 Masters of Business Administration
 MSc. Diabetes and Endocrinology
 M. Phil program
 Masters of Science in Bio statistics & Epidemiology (MSBE)

Doctorate programs 

 PhD – Basic Medical Sciences
 PhD – Public Health Program
 Doctor of Philosophy in Basic Medical Sciences
 Doctor of Philosophy in Clinical Medical Sciences
 Doctor of Philosophy in Public Health
 Doctor of Philosophy in Dental Sciences
 Doctor of Medicine-MD

Diploma courses 

 Diploma In Family Medicine
 Diploma In Medical Jurisprudence
 Diploma In Cardiology
 Diploma In Laryange Otorhinology
 Diploma In Critical Care Medicine
 Diploma In Tuberculosis & Chest Diseases
 Diploma In Child Health
 Diploma In Dermatology
 Diploma In Radiology
 Diploma In Anaesthesiology
 Diploma In Ophthalmology
 Diploma In Psychiatric Medicine
 Diploma in Echocardiography

Certificate courses 

 Certificate Course In Vascular Doppler Ultrasound
 Certificate Course In Color Doppler Ultrasound
 Certificate Course In Non Vascular Doppler Interventional Radiology
 Certificate Course In Neuro Spinal imaging
 Certificate Course In Ultrasonology

Journals

The Journal of the Dow University of Health Science  is published 4 monthly by Dow University of Health Sciences. It is recognised by Pakistan Medical and Dental Council and indexed in IMEMR, Pakmedinet and Global Health. It is also available as an online medical journal.

El Mednifico Journal (EISSN 2307-7301) is an open access, quarterly, peer-reviewed, international medical journal.

The Journal of Pakistan Medical Students JPMS, the Journal of Pioneering Medical Sciences, an open access, peer-reviewed, online medical journal is a peer-reviewed, international journal from the students of Dow Medical College. It was started by Anis Rehman and Haris Riaz, from Batch of 2011.

Social service activities
Patients' Welfare Association, also known as PWA, is one of the largest and oldest student run volunteer NGO of Pakistan. Students of Dow Medical College have been managing it since 1979. The organization is a blessing for the poor patients coming to Civil Hospital Karachi, helping them through its Blood Bank, Drug Bank, Thalassemia Services, and General and Tuberculosis Follow-Up Clinics. It has been cited in press for its earnest efforts in free patient service

Research & Development
Research at Dow University has discovered some variants of human gene, which may provide potency for fighting against Coronavirus disease 2019, as the sequence of virus in Pakistan is somewhat different from the Wuhan virus with few mutations Team of scientists at Karachi has earlier found and identified 9 gene compounds and their efficiency in controlling the growth of epidemic virus. On 13 April, Research team of Dow University disclosed that the DUHS finds a ray of hope in combating COVID-19 epidemic, by suggesting local IVIG from recovered patients holds the potential to control the progress of virus in host (infected).  They pointed out that this treatment process involves minimum risk with desired efficacy in recovering from COVID-19.

International conference on SDGs 
Office of Research, Innovation, & Commercialization (ORIC) and School of Public Health (SPH), Dow University of Health Sciences (DUHS) hosted a three-day international conference that focused on the sustainable development goals, for population health and wellbeing to achieve the targets by United States. The SDGs covered by DUHS are:

 Education, gender and inequality
 Health, well-being and demography
 Energy decarbonization and sustainable industry
 Sustainable food, land, water and oceans
 Sustainable cities and communities
 Digital revolution for sustainable development

Notable alumni
 Pushpa Kumari Kohli- First Hindu woman to become a police officer in Pakistan.
 Khatu Mal Jeewan, member of National Assembly.

References

External links
 Dow University of Health Sciences – Official website

 
Public universities and colleges in Sindh
Medical colleges in Sindh
Cancer organizations
HIV/AIDS research organisations
Universities and colleges in Karachi
Educational institutions established in 1945
1945 establishments in India